Plexin-D1 is a protein that in humans is encoded by the PLXND1 gene.

References

Further reading